Frederick Richard Dimbleby  (25 May 1913 – 22 December 1965) was an English journalist and broadcaster, who became the BBC's first war correspondent, and then its leading TV news commentator.

As host of the long-running current affairs programme Panorama, he pioneered a popular style of interviewing that was respectful but searching. At formal public events, he could combine gravitas with creative insights based on extensive research. He was also able to maintain interest throughout the all-night election specials.

The annual Richard Dimbleby Lecture was founded in his memory.

Biography

Early life
Dimbleby was born near Richmond, Surrey, the son of Gwendoline Mabel (Bolwell) and Frederick Jabez George Dimbleby, a journalist. He was educated at The Mall School, Twickenham, and at Mill Hill School, and began his career in 1931 on the Richmond and Twickenham Times, which his grandfather, Frederick William Dimbleby, had acquired in 1894.

He then worked as a news reporter on the Southern Evening Echo in Southampton, before joining the BBC as a radio news reporter in 1936, going on to cover the first Royal tour of Canada, and becoming their first war correspondent. He accompanied the British Expeditionary Force to France and made broadcasts from the battle of El Alamein and the Normandy beaches during the D-Day landings.

During the Second World War, he flew on some twenty raids as an observer with RAF Bomber Command, including one to Berlin, recording commentary for broadcast the following day. He was one of the first journalists to experiment with unconventional outside broadcasts, such as when flying in a de Havilland Mosquito accompanying a fighter aircraft raid on France, or being submerged in a diving suit.

In April 1945, as the BBC's war correspondent, he accompanied the British 11th Armoured Division to the liberation of the Bergen-Belsen concentration camp making one of the first reports. His description of what he saw there was so graphic the BBC declined to broadcast his despatch for four days, relenting only when he threatened to resign. An edited version was eventually aired, with references to Jews removed:

He described, in another broadcast, the wrecked interior of Hitler's Reich Chancellery at the war's end.

Broadcasting career
After the war, Dimbleby switched to television, eventually becoming the BBC's leading news commentator. He is perhaps best remembered as the commentator on a number of major public occasions, including the Coronation of Queen Elizabeth II in 1953 and the funerals of George VI, John F. Kennedy and Winston Churchill. He wrote a book about the coronation, Elizabeth Our Queen, which was given free to many schoolchildren at the time. He also wrote a London crime novel Storm at the Hook, published in 1948.

He took part in the first Eurovision television relay in 1951 and appeared in the first live television broadcast from the Soviet Union in 1961. He also introduced a special programme in July 1962 showing the first live television signal from the United States via the Telstar satellite. In addition to heavyweight journalism, he took part in lighter sound radio programmes such as Twenty Questions (as a panel member) and Down Your Way (which he hosted).

From 1955, he was the host of the flagship current affairs series Panorama. This programme saw him use his journalistic skills to full advantage in conducting searching, but polite interviews with key figures of the day, while acting as an urbane presenter for the programme. He was able to maintain his reporting talents by visiting places like Berlin, standing in front of the Brandenburg Gate a week before the Berlin Wall was erected across it by the communist authorities of East Germany.

Dimbleby's reputation was built upon his ability to describe events clearly yet with a sense of the drama and poetry of the many state occasions he covered. Examples included the Lying-in-State of George VI in Westminster Hall, where he depicted the stillness of the guardsmen standing like statues at the four corners of the catafalque, or the description of the drums at Kennedy's funeral which, he said, "beat as the pulse of a man's heart." His commentary for the funeral of Churchill in January 1965 was the last state event he commentated upon.

To produce his commentaries, he carried out encyclopedic research on all aspects of the venues of great events, their history and that of the ceremonies taking place, and the personalities involved. This was a necessary part of radio commentary, which transferred well to television coverage. He could also improvise extensively if there were delays in the schedule. His audience always felt that they were in "safe hands", especially in Panorama programmes like the one dealing with the Cuban Missile Crisis.

Inevitably, because of his close association with establishment figures and royalty, some people criticised his "hushed tones" style of speaking at state occasions, claiming he was pompous. In an interview, he laughed off such attacks, explaining that even though he had to use a special microphone, which covered his mouth to obviate his speaking disrupting the solemn atmosphere, he still had to pitch his voice low to avoid his voice carrying. A more common touch was demonstrated in his friendly broadcasts like Down Your Way where he met thousands of ordinary people in towns and villages, and the many trade unionists, politicians and industrialists etc. who appeared on Panorama and other programmes. Dimbleby also showed stamina and imperturbability in marathon election night broadcasts which ran from 10pm, when the polls closed, until around 6 or 7am the following morning.

Controversy and comedy
During his time with Panorama, Dimbleby narrated the famous spaghetti-tree hoax on 1 April 1957, as an April Fool's Day joke.

After commentating for half an hour on Elizabeth II's state visit in 1965 to Germany, Dimbleby uttered the mild expletive, "Jesus wept," unaware that the microphone was live, after discovering that the TV pictures had failed for all 30 minutes, meaning he would have to repeat the commentary again.

Private life and honours
Dimbleby married Dilys Thomas in Copthorne, West Sussex, in 1937. The couple had four children, two of whom, David and Jonathan, have followed in his footsteps to become major broadcasting figures in their own right, both hosting election night broadcasts (David on the BBC, Jonathan on ITN). In addition, Dimbleby's third son, Nicholas, sculpted the plaque in his father's name that was placed in Poets' Corner in 1990. They also had a daughter-Sally. Dilys Dimbleby died in 2009.

In June 1946, Dimbleby was appointed Officer of the Order of the British Empire (OBE) for services as a war correspondent. In the 1959 Queen's Birthday Honours, he was promoted to Commander of the Order of the British Empire (CBE).

Death and legacy

On 22 December 1965, Dimbleby died at the age of 52. He had been suffering from testicular cancer which had been diagnosed five years earlier. In 1962 he had presented a documentary on the links between heavy tobacco smoking and lung cancer. Dimbleby decided to admit he was ill with cancer, which, at the time, was a taboo disease to mention. It was helpful in building public consciousness of the disease and investing more resources in finding a cure. The Richard Dimbleby Cancer Fund was founded in his memory. Dimbleby was cremated, the ceremony receiving national publicity.

In 1986 "Celebration of a Broadcaster",  commemorating Dimbleby, was held in Westminster Abbey. In April 2013, he was honoured by the Royal Mail, as one of six people selected as subjects for the "Great Britons" commemorative postage stamp issue.

Richard Dimbleby lecture
The Richard Dimbleby Lecture was founded in his memory in 1972 and is delivered every year by an influential public figure. Speakers have included:

 2004 – James Dyson
 2005 – Ian Blair
 2006 – Mike Jackson
 2007 – Craig Venter
 2009 – Prince Charles
 2010 – Terry Pratchett
 2011 – Michael Morpurgo
 2012 – Paul Nurse
 2013 – Bill Gates
 2014 – Christine Lagarde
 2015 – Martha Lane Fox
 2016 – Gregory Doran
 2017 – John O Brennan
 2018 – Jeanette Winterson
 2019 – Tim Berners-Lee
 2021 – Sarah Gilbert

References

External links
 Biography from museum.tv
 Richard Dimbleby on the BBC
 

1913 births
1965 deaths
English television presenters
English male journalists
Commanders of the Order of the British Empire
Richard
Panorama (British TV programme)
People educated at Mill Hill School
Deaths from testicular cancer
English war correspondents
Deaths from cancer in England